José Desiderio Valverde Pérez (1822December 22, 1903) was a Dominican military figure and politician.  He served as president of the Dominican Republic from June 13, 1858 until August 31, 1858.

References
Biography at the Enciclopedia Virtual Dominicana

1822 births
1903 deaths
19th-century Dominican Republic politicians
People from Santiago de los Caballeros
Presidents of the Dominican Republic
Dominican Republic military personnel
White Dominicans